If I Had My Way is a 1940 musical comedy film directed by David Butler and starring Bing Crosby and Gloria Jean. Based on a story by David Butler, the film is about a construction worker who takes charge of the daughter of a friend killed in an accident.

Filming took place in Hollywood between February and April 1940. This was another independent production for Crosby outside his Paramount contract and he took a financial interest in it. The film had its New York premiere at the Rivoli Theater on May 5, 1940.

Plot
Buzz Blackwell, Fred Johnson and Axel Swenson are construction workers in San Francisco who are helping to build the Golden Gate Bridge. They are good friends, and Buzz and Axel even help Fred in raising his daughter Patricia. When Fred tragically dies in an accident, Patricia is forced to go and live with her relatives in New York City, whom she has never met. Buzz and Axel decide to travel with her.

They soon arrive at the home of her uncle Jarvis Johnson, a snobby rich man with a supercilious wife. Jarvis has received a letter from Buzz, but wants no part in raising Patricia. When they show up, Jarvis pretends to be someone else and sends them to the other "J. Johnson", Joe, another uncle. Joe and Marian are poor ex-vaudevillans, but welcome the girl with open arms. Buzz wants to give Joe the money Fred left for Patricia, but finds out a drunken Axel used this money to buy a Swedish restaurant.

Buzz is determined to help, and turns the restaurant into a nightclub, using a loan from Jarvis, which he obtained through false pretenses. Jarvis returns to claim his money back, but the club is a success and he is repaid.

Cast
 Bing Crosby as Buzz Blackwell
 Gloria Jean as Patricia Johnson
 Charles Winninger as Joe Johnson
 El Brendel as Axel Swenson
 Allyn Joslyn as Jarvis Johnson
 Claire Dodd as Brenda Johnson
 Moroni Olsen as Mr. Blair
 Nana Bryant as Marian Johnson
 Donald Woods as Fred Johnson
 Kathryn Adams as Miss Corbett
 Brandon Hurst as Hedges
 Verna Felton as Mrs. De Lacy
 Dell Henderson as Mr. Harris
 Joe King as Bank Guard
 Emory Parnell as Gustav Erickson
 Blanche Ring as herself
 Eddie Leonard as himself
 Julian Eltinge as himself
 Trixie Friganza as herself

Reception
Reviewers in 1940 had kind words for Bing and Gloria, but complained about the timeworn storyline. "Although it can hardly be termed an original model," said Boxoffice, [the Crosby film] is nicely tailored to his distinctive brand of comedy and crooning. Bing is ably aided and abetted by Gloria Jean, captivating miss of the silvery voice. In fact the teaming of these two song birds is a ten-strike in smart casting and the resultant feature has much to offer customers of all ages and tastes, with a bonus for the oldsters who will enjoy a nostalgic thrill through the appearances of Blanche Ring, Eddie Leonard, and several other oldtimers whose stars shone brightly during the golden era of the theatah."

Bosley Crowther, writing in The New York Times, was not impressed, saying "The sum total is but a moderately amusing musical, more often flat than sharp—and this we say in spite of the fellow sitting next to us who kept telling his girl-friend solemnly, 'This is very entertaining, indeed.'"

Variety did not think much of the film either. "Bing Crosby will likely want to forget this cinematic adventure just as quickly as possible. Way below par as compared with his releases for both Universal and Paramount during the past two years, If I Had My Way will need all of his draw strength to get it through the key runs for nominal grosses."

Upon the film's DVD release in 2006, DVD Talk praised Crosby and thought Jean was cute, but criticized the plot, and called the film "strictly second-run material".

Soundtrack
 "Meet the Sun Half-Way" (James V. Monaco / Johnny Burke) sung by Bing Crosby and Gloria Jean.
 "I Haven't Time to Be a Millionaire" (James V. Monaco / Johnny Burke) sung by Bing Crosby, Gloria Jean and El Brendel.
 "The Pessimistic Character" (James V. Monaco / Johnny Burke) sung by Bing Crosby.
 "If I Had My Way" (James Kendis / Lou Klein) sung by Bing Crosby.
 "April Played the Fiddle" (James V. Monaco / Johnny Burke) sung by Bing Crosby and Six Hits and a Miss.
 "Ida, Sweet As Apple Cider" (Eddie Leonard / Eddie Munson) sung by Eddie Leonard.
 "Little Grey Home in the West" (Hermann Löhr / D. Eardley-Wilmot) sung by Gloria Jean.
 "I've Got Rings On My Fingers" sung by Blanche Ring.

Bing Crosby recorded a number of the songs for Decca Records. "April Played the Fiddle" enjoyed seven weeks in the Billboard charts, peaking at No. 10. "Meet the Sun Half Way" reached the No. 15 mark during four weeks in the charts. Crosby's songs were also included in the Bing's Hollywood series.

Home media
On November 14, 2006, Universal Studios released If I Had My Way as part of the Bing Crosby:Screen Legend Collection on Region 1 DVD.  The 3-disc set also includes Double or Nothing (1937), Waikiki Wedding (1937), East Side of Heaven (1939), and Here Come the Waves (1944).

References

External links
 
 
 

1940 films
1940 musical comedy films
American musical comedy films
American black-and-white films
Films directed by David Butler
Universal Pictures films
1940s American films